Heleobops docimus is a species of very small aquatic snail, an operculate gastropod mollusk in the family Cochliopidae.

Distribution

Description 
The maximum recorded shell length is 5.1 mm.

Habitat 
Minimum recorded depth is 0 m. Maximum recorded depth is 0 m.

References

External links

Cochliopidae
Gastropods described in 1968